Chizar is a neighborhood in Shemiran, north of Tehran, Iran. Chizar used to be a village which was gradually annexed to the capital with the expansion of Tehran city. Chizar neighborhood has a long religious history indicated by the presence of Imamzadeh Ali Akbar.

References 

Neighbourhoods in Tehran